The Canton of Vallespir-Albères is a French canton of Pyrénées-Orientales department, in Occitanie. At the French canton reorganisation which came into effect in March 2015, the canton was created including 8 communes from the canton of Céret and 5 from the canton of Argelès-sur-Mer.

Composition 
 L'Albère
 Le Boulou
 Céret
 Les Cluses
 Laroque-des-Albères
 Maureillas-las-Illas
 Montesquieu-des-Albères
 Le Perthus
 Saint-Génis-des-Fontaines
 Saint-Jean-Pla-de-Corts
 Sorède
 Villelongue-dels-Monts
 Vivès

References

Aspres